Thunder Bay/Eldorado Aerodrome  is an aerodrome located  east of Thunder Bay, Ontario, Canada.

See also
 List of airports in the Thunder Bay area

References

Registered aerodromes in Ontario
Transport in Thunder Bay District